The Mind Game is a novel by Norman Spinrad published in 1980.

Plot summary
The Mind Game is a novel in which the wife of a television director joins a religious cult, Transformationalism.

Reception
Greg Costikyan reviewed The Mind Game in Ares Magazine #6 and commented that "it is a gripping, tense thriller to which these ideas form an intricate backdrop."

Dave Pringle reviewed The Mind Game (as The Process) for Imagine magazine, and stated that "This is an angry book, full of ambition, frustration, and depictions of torrid sex. It is overwritten and overlong, as all Spinrad's novels are, but it packs an unavoidable punch."

Reviews
Review by Andrew M. Andrews (1985) in Fantasy Review, August 1985

References

1980 American novels
American thriller novels
Books about cults
Jove Books books